Pettinen is a Finnish surname. Notable people with the surname include:

 August Pettinen (1857–1914), Finnish missionary
 Tomi Pettinen (born 1977), Finnish ice hockey player

Finnish-language surnames